This is a list of animated television series first aired in 2021.

See also 
 2021 in animation
 2021 in anime
 List of animated feature films of 2021

Notes

References 

2021
2021
Television series
2021-related lists
Animated series